KVST may refer to:

 KVST (FM), a radio station (99.7 FM) licensed to serve Huntsville, Texas, United States
 KVST-TV, a defunct television station in Los Angeles, California, United States on UHF channel 68.